The Women's relay event of the Biathlon World Championships 2013 was held on February 15, 2013. Twenty-five nations participated over a course of 4 × 6km.

Results
The race was started at 17:15.

References

Women's relay
2013 in Czech women's sport